A gadfly is a person who interferes with the status quo of a society or community by posing novel, potentially upsetting questions, usually directed at authorities. The term is originally associated with the ancient Greek philosopher Socrates in his defense when on trial for his life.

History

Socrates
The term "gadfly" (mýops) was used by Plato in the Apology to describe Socrates' acting as an uncomfortable goad to the Athenian political scene, like a spur or biting fly arousing a sluggish horse.

During his defense when on trial for his life, Socrates, according to Plato's writings, pointed out that dissent, like the gadfly, was easy to swat, but the cost to society of silencing individuals who were irritating could be very high: "If you kill a man like me, you will injure yourselves more than you will injure me" because his role was that of a gadfly, "to sting people and whip them into a fury, all in the service of truth."

Modern politics
In modern politics, a gadfly is someone who persistently challenges people in positions of power, the status quo or a popular position. For example, Morris Kline wrote, "There is a function for the gadfly who poses questions that many specialists would like to overlook. Polemics is healthy." The word may be uttered in a pejorative sense or be accepted as a description of honourable work or civic duty.

Contemporary philosophy 
The Australian moral philosopher Peter Singer has expressed views which have led him to be described as a "modern gadfly".

See also
Concern troll – a false flag pseudonym created by a user whose actual point of view is opposed to the one that the troll claims to hold
Devil's advocate – taking a position one does not necessarily agree with
Gadfly (mythology)
The Gadfly – novel

References

External links

Change
Cognitive inertia
Concepts in ethics
Group processes
Metaphors referring to insects
Dialogues of Plato